Abdul Warith Bolaji Alatishe (born January 22, 2000) is a Nigerian-American professional basketball player for the Ontario Clippers of the NBA G League. He played college basketball for the Oregon State Beavers of the Pac-12 Conference. He also played for the Nicholls Colonels.

Early life and high school career
Born in Ibadan, Nigeria, Alatishe moved to Houston, Texas at age three. He started playing organized basketball as a junior at Westside High School in Houston. He committed to playing college basketball at Nicholls, the only NCAA Division I program to offer him.

College career
Alatishe received limited playing time as a freshman at Nicholls. As a sophomore, he averaged 10.9 points and 8.3 rebounds per game, earning Third Team All-Southland honors. For his junior season, Alatishe transferred to Oregon State. He chose the Beavers over Texas A&M, being drawn there by assistant coach Marlon Stewart. He received a waiver for immediate eligibility from the National Collegiate Athletic Association. As a junior, Alatishe earned Pac-12 All-Defensive Honorable Mention. He led Oregon State to its first Pac-12 tournament title and was named tournament most outstanding player. Alatishe averaged 9.5 points, 8.6 rebounds, and 1.4 blocks per game. Following the season, he declared for the 2021 NBA draft, but ultimately returned to Oregon State.

Professional career

Ontario Clippers (2022–present)
On October 24, 2022, Alatishe joined the Ontario Clippers training camp roster.

Career statistics

College

|-
| style="text-align:left;"| 2018–19
| style="text-align:left;"| Nicholls
| 13 || 0 || 7.8 || .375 || – || .429 || 1.7 || .2 || .2 || .2 || 1.2
|-
| style="text-align:left;"| 2019–20
| style="text-align:left;"| Nicholls
| 31 || 29 || 25.3 || .555 || .222 || .711 || 8.3 || 1.2 || 1.7 || 1.3 || 10.9
|-
| style="text-align:left;"| 2020–21
| style="text-align:left;"| Oregon State
| style="background:#cfecec;"|33* || style="background:#cfecec;"|33* || 27.4 || .509 || .071 || .537 || 8.6 || 1.8 || 1.2 || 1.4 || 9.5
|- class="sortbottom"
| style="text-align:center;" colspan="2"| Career
| 77 || 62 || 23.3 || .526 || .130 || .636 || 7.3 || 1.3 || 1.2 || 1.2 || 8.7

Personal life
His father, Murtadha, is a longtime friend of Hall of Fame basketball player Hakeem Olajuwon. Both of his parents are nurses. Alatishe comes from a Muslim family.

References

External links
Oregon State Beavers bio
Nicholls Colonels bio

2000 births
Living people
American men's basketball players
Nigerian men's basketball players
Small forwards
Sportspeople from Ibadan
Basketball players from Houston
Oregon State Beavers men's basketball players
Nicholls Colonels men's basketball players
Nigerian emigrants to the United States